Christine Grønbech (born 24 October 1993 as Christine Svensen) is a Danish female curler.

At the international level, she is a two-time European Junior Challenge silver medallist (2010, 2012).

At the national level, she is a 2014 Danish women's champion, four-time mixed doubles champion (2009, 2010, 2018, 2019) and five-time junior champion (2010, 2011, 2012, 2014, 2015).

Teams

Women's

Mixed doubles

Personal life
In 2017 she married fellow Danish curler and coach Martin Uhd Grønbech. They played together in mixed doubles championships.

References

External links
 
 

Living people
1993 births
Danish female curlers
Danish curling champions
Place of birth missing (living people)